The year 1851 in architecture involved some significant architectural events and new buildings.

Events
 Missions Héliographiques established by Prosper Mérimée to photograph historical French architecture.

Buildings and structures

Buildings opened

 February 5 – Saint Thomas Episcopal Church and Rectory, Smithfield, Rhode Island, USA, designed by Thomas Alexander Tefft.
 May 1
 The Crystal Palace, home of the Great Exhibition, erected in Hyde Park, London to the design of Joseph Paxton.
 Permanent Windsor Riverside railway station in England completed to the design of William Tite.
 May 31 – Madonna dell'Archetto, Rome Italy.
 July 25 – Holy Trinity Church, Bangalore, India.
 October 1 – Alabama State Capitol, Montgomery, Alabama.

Buildings completed

 Osborne House on the Isle of Wight, England, designed by Prince Albert in consultation with builder Thomas Cubitt.
 Dock Tower in Grimsby, England.
 Donaldson's Hospital in Edinburgh, Scotland, designed by William Henry Playfair.
 De Wachter, Zuidlaren, Netherlands.
 Wat San Chao Chet, Bangkok, Thailand.
 Stone Bastei Bridge, Saxony.

Buildings commenced
 St. Stephen's Basilica in Budapest, Hungary, designed by Miklós Ybl.
 Muhammad Amin Khan Madrasa in Khiva, Uzbekistan.
 Hurstpierpoint College in England, designed by Richard Cromwell Carpenter.

Publications
 Gottfried Semper – The Four Elements of Architecture, part 1
 Edmund Sharpe – The Seven Periods of English Architecture.

Awards
 RIBA Royal Gold Medal – Thomas Leverton Donaldson.
 Grand Prix de Rome, architecture – Gabriel-Auguste Ancelet.

Births
 March 10 – Heinrich Wenck, Danish architect (died 1936)
 March 26 – John Eisenmann, Cleveland-based US architect (died 1924)
 June 29 – (Edmund) Peter Paul Pugin, English architect, son of Augustus Welby Pugin and half-brother of Edward Welby Pugin (died 1904)

Deaths
 October 13 – Samuel Beazley, British theatre architect and writer (born 1786)
 October 25 – Giorgio Pullicino, Maltese painter and architect (born 1779)
 November 18 – Jacob Ephraim Polzin, German Neoclassical architect (born 1778)

References

Architecture
Years in architecture
19th-century architecture